The Denver Community School District is a rural public school district that serves the town of Denver, Iowa and surrounding areas in southern Bremer County and northern Black Hawk County.

The school, which serves all grade levels K-12 on one campus, is located at 520 Lincoln St. in Denver.  The Early Elementary School (PK) is located at 401 E. Franling St. in Denver.

The school's mascot is the Cyclone. Their colors are red and gold.

Schools
Denver Early Elementary School
Denver Elementary School
Denver Middle School
Denver High School

Denver High School

Athletics
The Cyclones compete in the North Iowa Cedar League Conference in the following sports:

Bowling
Cross Country (boys and girls)
 Boys' State Champions - 1994
Volleyball (girls)
Football (boys)
State Champions - 1995
Basketball (boys and girls)
Boys' State Champions - 1984
Wrestling (boys and girls)
 Boys' State Champions (as Denver-Tripoli) - 2010, 2012  (Denver ended shared wrestling with Tripoli in 2017)
Track and Field (boys and girls)
Golf (boys and girls)
 Boys' State Champions - 1982
 Girls' State Champions - 1980, 1989
Baseball (boys)
Softball (girls)
Soccer (boys and girls)
Tennis (boys and girls)

See also
List of school districts in Iowa
List of high schools in Iowa

References

External links
 Denver Community School District

Education in Black Hawk County, Iowa
Education in Bremer County, Iowa
School districts in Iowa